Ma'ruf is an Islamic term meaning that which is "well-known, universally accepted,  ... that which is good, beneficial ...; fairness, equity, equitableness;".  It is used 38 times in the Quran. The word is most often found in the Qur'anic exhortation:  "Amr bil Ma'ruf wa Nahy an al Munkar", often translated as "Enjoin the good and forbid the wrong".

Pre-modern Islamic literature describes pious Muslims (usually scholars) taking action to forbid wrong by destroying forbidden objects, particularly liquor and musical instruments. In the contemporary Muslim world, various state or parastatal bodies (often with phrases like the "Promotion of Virtue and the Prevention of Vice" in their titles) have appeared in Iran, Saudi Arabia, Nigeria, Sudan, Malaysia, etc., at various times and with various levels of power.

There is a hadith in which Muhammad is quoted as saying, "My ummah will never agree upon an error." This has been interpreted to mean that the consensus of the community is a source of moral and legal authority.

There is also another verse in Quran, that says "", often translated as “those who are close to you--or relatives--have priority for good deeds”.                                                                                        
                
Ma'ruf is also the name of a US-based Muslim organization that advocates social justice by serving individuals, families, and communities in need.

See also
Maruf (disambiguation)
Maharoof (Sri Lankan surname)
Enjoining good and forbidding wrong
Hisbah
Ijma

References

Arabic words and phrases in Sharia
Islamic terminology